Kinassery is located  in Kozhikode district of Kerala state, south India. It belongs to the south Kerala Division. Famous Kinassery Vocational Higher Secondary School is near the Kinassery bus stop.

Transportation
Kinassery can be reached from Kozhikode city by bus. It is 4.7 km from Calicut railway station. One can take the buses destined to Kulangara Peedika, Perumanna, Pokkunnu, Pantheeramkavu etc. from Kozhikode city. Kinassery formerly "NACHERY PADADM" is the well known city in Kozhikode.

Important Landmarks
A government Higher Secondary School, Guruvayoorappan College, one Govt UP school, and LP school are working in Kinassery area.  
	11 mosques, 2 temples, 7 madrasas, and one orphanage are working  in kinassery. The Markaz English Medium School working in Kinassery. That is one only CBSE school in the area
	The mosque are following Kinasseri Masjidul Mujahideen, Thottummaram Sunni masjid, Kinasssery Shafi Juma Masjid, Kinassery Mahallu Juma Masjid Kulangara peedika, Pokkunnu Salafi Masjid, Kinassery North Juma masjid, Manthravil Juma Masjid, konthanari Juma Masjid.
	Mahallu Qabarsthan is at Konthanari juma masjid premises. 
	The Temples are Kinassery Durga bagavathi kshethram and Kinassery Shiva kshethram.
	Kinassery Public Library & Reading room is in Kulangara Peedika. 
Cities and towns in Kozhikode district